Surrey Hills railway station was located on the Lilydale and Belgrave lines in Victoria, Australia between Union and Chatham stations. It served the eastern Melbourne suburb of Surrey Hills. It opened on 13 August 1883 and closed on 17 February 2023 due to project works of the Level Crossing Removal Project.

History
Initially, two trains ran to Lilydale each day and five only to Box Hill. At the time, engineers were unwilling to allow trains to stop at Surrey Hills, claiming potential difficulties with re-starting the gradient, and also that there was not enough traffic to warrant the stop.

In April 1883, a deputation asked for Surrey Hills to be a flag station, so that passengers wishing to alight could inform the guard of that at the previous station, while those wishing to join the train could show a red flag, or a red lamp at night. By August of that year, trains would stop on request. On 1 September of that year, Surrey Hills station was brought into regular service. The station first appeared in the Victorian Railways working timetable on 15 October of that year.

On 9 December 1888, a second track opened, combined with a new platform on the north side of the line. By the 1930s, a small goods yard had been provided to the south of the station, in what is now a car park. The connection to the mainline was at the Box Hill (Down) end of the station.

In 1962, boom barriers replaced interlocked gates at the Union Road level crossing, located at the Up end of the station. In 1966, the goods yard, a signal box, a number of sidings and a crossover were removed to allow work on a third track to be carried out. At that time, the current station buildings were provided, and the former city-bound platform was converted to an island platform. In December 1971, services on the third track from East Camberwell were extended though the station to Box Hill.

In June 2001, Surrey Hills was upgraded to a Premium Station.

On 14 September 2016, two people were killed when a motor vehicle and an express X'Trapolis train set collided at the Union Road level crossing. Severe damage resulted to the train, and the vehicle was dragged 150 metres before coming to a mangled rest between the station platform and train. The station underpass was also damaged.

In 2020, it was announced by the Level Crossing Removal Authority that the level crossings at Union and Mont Albert roads would be removed by 2023. The project will involve the closure of both Surrey Hills and nearby Mont Albert, with a brand new Union station to be provided between the two current stations. Plans for the grade separation of the Union Road level crossing with a road overpass have dated as far back as the late 1970s.

On 17 February 2023, the station permanently closed at 8:30 pm alongside Mont Albert station. The brand new Union station is expected to be opened by May 2023.

Platforms and services
Surrey Hills had one island platform (Platforms 1 and 2) and a side platform (Platform 3), linked by an underpass. The island platform featured a large brick building with a customer service window, an enclosed waiting room and toilets. There was a small brick building on Platform 3.

It was serviced by Metro Trains' Lilydale and Belgrave line services.

Platforms 1:
  all stations and limited express services to Flinders Street
  all stations and limited express services to Flinders Street

Platforms 2:
  all stations and limited express services to Lilydale
  all stations and limited express services to Belgrave

Platforms 3:
  weekday all stations and limited express services to Lilydale; weekday all stations services to Blackburn
  weekday all stations and limited express services to Belgrave; weekday all stations services to Blackburn

Transport links
CDC Melbourne operated one route via Surrey Hills station, under contract to Public Transport Victoria:
 : Box Hill Central - Chadstone Shopping Centre
Ventura Bus Lines operated one route via Surrey Hills station, under contract to Public Transport Victoria:
 : Box Hill Central - Burwood

References

External links
Melway map at street-directory.com.au

Railway stations in Melbourne
Railway stations in Australia opened in 1883
Railway stations closed in 2023
Disused railway stations in Melbourne
2023 disestablishments in Australia